Source Filmmaker (often abbreviated as SFM) is a 3D computer graphics software toolset published by Valve for creating animated films, which utilizes the Source game engine. Source Filmmaker has been used to create many community-based animated shorts for popular Source games, including Team Fortress 2, the Left 4 Dead series, and Half-Life 2. On June 27, 2012, Valve released a free, open beta version of SFM via Steam.

Overview
Source Filmmaker is a tool for animating, editing, and rendering 3D animated videos using assets from different games which use the Source platform, including sounds, models, and backdrops. SFM also allows for the creation of still images, art, and posters.

SFM includes three different user interfaces and a "work camera" for previewing an active scene. The three interfaces are used for creating clips, controlling animation, and fine-tuned adjustments which include:

The Clip Editor; for recording, editing, and arranging shots. They hold the user's recorded gameplay and virtual assets. It also allows the user to place and arranges sound files and video filters.
The Motion Editor; for motion adjustments over time, such as blending two animations. Users can also use motion presets to select paths, and manipulate different scene objects, play clips in different times, and puppeteer the characters in different positions and frames.
The Graph Editor; for editing motion by creating keyframes that can be used for pose-to-pose animation.

Users can either create new projects or import data from Source-based games to extend their SFM animations, with the ability to record and edit the same screen endlessly. Additionally, SFM supports a wide range of cinematographic effects and techniques such as motion blur, Tyndall effects, dynamic lighting, and depth of field. Users can also rig 3D characters and can use inverse kinematics to manually animate movements that do not already exist in the games they imported assets from.

Production and updates

Pre-release
SFM was developed internally at Valve in 2005 and forked from the in-game demo playback tool found in Source. SFM was successfully used to make Day of Defeat: Source trailers with experimental effects that could not be achieved in real-time. The tool's full potential was finally realized with the release of The Orange Box, particularly with the Meet the Team featurettes for Team Fortress 2. This version of SFM, which ran using Source's in-game tools framework, was unintentionally leaked during the public beta of Team Fortress 2 in September 2007. By 2010, the entire interface was re-implemented using Qt 4, and given its engine branch for further development.

Before SFM was released to the public, Team Fortress 2 carried a simplified version of SFM known as the "Replay Editor," which was limited to capturing the actual events occurring throughout a player's life. It provided no ability to modify actions, repeat segments, or apply special effects beyond those already used in-game. However, arbitrary camera angles were possible, such as tracking the movements of other players in action at the time. The Replay Editor also allowed users to upload completed videos to YouTube.

On June 27, 2012, SFM became available on a limited basis through Steam, the same day the final Meet the Team video "Meet the Pyro" was released. The open beta for Windows was released .

Other updates
On April 1, 2013, Valve implemented support for the Steam Workshop, which allows users to upload their custom-made assets onto the Steam community. These assets range from video game models and sound to animation project files.

A version of SFM for Valve's Source 2 engine was released on May 15, 2020, alongside other development tools for Half-Life: Alyx.

See also

Saxxy Awards
Machinima
Source Filmmaker (Valve Developer Community)

References

External links

Steam Store page
Source Filmmaker in Valve Developer Community

2012 software
3D animation software
3D graphics software
3D graphics software that uses Qt
C++ software
Machinima
Proprietary software that uses Qt
Python (programming language) software
Software articles needing attention
Source (game engine)
Video game development software
Windows-only freeware